David Joseph Huddart (born 18 November 1937) is an English former professional footballer of the 1960s.  He played professionally for Aldershot and Gillingham and made a total of 10 appearances in the Football League.

References

1937 births
English footballers
Association football goalkeepers
English Football League players
Aldershot F.C. players
Gillingham F.C. players
People from Maryport
Living people
Footballers from Cumbria